The 1925 Preakness Stakes was the 50th running of the $50,000 Preakness Stakes horse race for three-year-old Thoroughbreds . The race took place on May 8, 1925 and was run 8 days before the Kentucky Derby. Ridden by Clarence Kummer, Coventry won the race by four lengths over runner-up Backbone. The race was run on a track rated fast in a final time of 1:59 0/0.

Payout 
The 51st Preakness Stakes Payout Schedule

The full chart 
Daily Racing Form charts:

† & Ŧ - coupled 

 Winning Breeder: Edward F. Simms; (KY)

Times: 1/4 mile – 0:23 2/5; 1/2 mile – 47 3/5; 3/4 mile – 1:12 3/5; mile – 1:38 4/5; 1 3/16 (final) – 1:59 0/0
Track Condition: Fast

References

External links 
 

1925
Pimlico Race Course
1925 in horse racing
1925 in American sports
1925 in sports in Maryland
Horse races in Maryland